The 1938–39 Illinois Fighting Illini men's basketball team represented the University of Illinois.

Regular season
The 1938-39 season was year number three for head coach Doug Mills.  Overall the team regrouped from a miserable eighth-place finish in the Big Ten a year earlier by winning 9 of their 10 home games only losing to conference rival Indiana.  Unfortunately for the Fighting Illini they finished with a 5-5 record on the road to finish in third place overall in conference action.  Mills' Illinois Fighting Illini men's basketball team featured only 5 returning letterman. Along with team captain Tom Nisbit, the Illini also featured a starting lineup of Lewis Dehner at the center position, John Drish, Joe Frank and William Hapac at forward and George Wardley, and Colin Handlon at guard.

Roster

Source

Schedule

|-	
!colspan=12 style="background:#DF4E38; color:white;"| Non-Conference regular season

|- align="center" bgcolor=""

|-
!colspan=9 style="background:#DF4E38; color:#FFFFFF;"|Big Ten regular season

Bold Italic connotes conference game
												
Source

Awards and honors
 Louis Dehner 
Madison Square Garden 1st team All-American
Converse 3rd team All-American

References

Illinois
Illinois Fighting Illini men's basketball seasons
1938 in sports in Illinois
1939 in sports in Illinois